Horace E. Stockbridge (May 19, 1857–October 30, 1930) was an American agricultural chemist who became the first president of North Dakota Agricultural College (now North Dakota State University).

Early life and education 
Stockbridge was born in Hadley, Massachusetts, and graduated from Massachusetts Agricultural College (now the University of Massachusetts Amherst) in 1878. After working for the USDA and as an instructor at the college, he went to graduate school at Boston University and then the University of Göttingen, where he completed his Ph.D. in 1884.

Career 
Upon completing graduate school, Stockbridge returned to the Massachusetts Agricultural College faculty but in 1885 moved to the Japanese Imperial College of Agriculture and Engineering.

Returning to the US, Stockbridge became president of North Dakota Agricultural College from 1890 to 1893. He later joined the faculty of the Florida Agricultural College.

Legacy 
At North Dakota State University, a residence hall was named after Stockbridge in 1957.

References

1857 births
1930 deaths
20th-century American chemists
Presidents of North Dakota State University
University of Göttingen alumni
Massachusetts Agricultural College alumni
19th-century American chemists
People from Hadley, Massachusetts
United States Department of Agriculture people
University of Florida faculty
Agricultural chemists